Abdelhafid Boussouf (17 August 1926, Mila, Algeria – 31 December 1980 Paris, France) was an Algerian nationalist and a leader of the Front de libération nationale (FLN) during the Algerian War of Independence (1954–62). He was a member of the GPRA exile government, serving as minister of armaments (Ministre de l'armement et des liaisons générales). This body, the MALG, after independence evolved into the Securité militaire (SM), or military intelligence, which eventually emerged as a pillar of the military-backed regimes of Algeria, and whose successor organization (DRS) remains of overwhelming importance in Algerian politics today. After independence, however, he personally left politics and remained outside of the governing circle to pursue a career in business. He died on December 31, 1980, in Paris.  His name was given to the university of his hometown Mila.

See also
 Declaration of 1 November 1954

References

1926 births
1980 deaths
People from Mila
Algerian People's Party politicians
Movement for the Triumph of Democratic Liberties politicians
National Liberation Front (Algeria) politicians
Government ministers of Algeria
Algerian revolutionaries
Algerian intelligence agency personnel
Directors of intelligence agencies